The 2017 UEFA Super Cup was the 42nd edition of the UEFA Super Cup, an annual football match organised by UEFA and contested by the reigning champions of the two main European club competitions, the UEFA Champions League and the UEFA Europa League. The match featured Spanish side Real Madrid, the title holders and winners of the 2016–17 UEFA Champions League, and English side Manchester United, the winners of the 2016–17 UEFA Europa League. The match was played at the Philip II Arena in Skopje, Macedonia, on 8 August 2017, and was the first UEFA final staged in the country.

Real Madrid won the match 2–1 for their second consecutive and fourth overall UEFA Super Cup title.

Teams

While the two teams had never met in the Super Cup, they had met 10 times in the European Champion Clubs' Cup/UEFA Champions League; Real Madrid had the advantage in the teams' previous meetings, with four wins, four draws and two losses.

Venue

The Philip II Arena was announced as the final venue on 30 June 2015, following the decision of the UEFA Executive Committee meeting in Prague, Czech Republic.

Pre-match

Ticketing
With a stadium capacity of 30,500 for the match, a total number of 23,000 tickets were available to fans and the general public, being available for sale to fans worldwide via UEFA.com from 13 June to 4 July 2017 in three price categories: €50, €30, and €15. The remaining tickets were allocated to the local organising committee, UEFA and national associations, commercial partners and broadcasters.

Match

Officials
Italian referee Gianluca Rocchi was announced as the referee by UEFA on 20 July 2017.

Summary
In the 16th minute, Casemiro headed against the bar after a corner from the left-hand side by Toni Kroos, before opening the scoring eight minutes later with a left-footed strike after a pass into the box from Dani Carvajal. Isco made it 2–0 in the 52nd minute when he side-footed the ball into the bottom corner of the net from six yards after a pass from Gareth Bale. In the 61st minute, Bale hit the bar with a shot from the right of the penalty area. Romelu Lukaku pulled a goal back for Manchester United a minute later when he followed up on an initial shot from Nemanja Matić, which was parried back into his path by Keylor Navas.

Details
The Champions League winners were designated as the "home" team for administrative purposes.

Statistics

See also
2017 UEFA Champions League Final
2017 UEFA Europa League Final
Manchester United F.C. in international football competitions
Real Madrid CF in international football competitions

References

External links

UEFA Super Cup (official website)
2017 UEFA Super Cup, UEFA.com

2017
Super Cup
Super Cup
Super Cup 2017
Super Cup 2017
Real Madrid CF matches
Manchester United F.C. matches
Super Cup
Super Cup
August 2017 sports events in Europe
2010s in Skopje